Pseudoxanthomonas is a genus of Gram-negative bacteria in the family Xanthomonadaceae from the phylum Pseudomonadota. This genus is closely related phylogenetically with the genera Xanthomonas, Xylella, and Stenotrophomonas.
The genus was first distinguished in 2000 in biofilter samples, and was later emended by Lee et al.
Some of the species in this genus are: P. mexicana, P. japonensis, P. koreensis, P. daejeonensis, and the type species P. broegbernensis.

References

External links 
LPSN

Xanthomonadales
Bacteria genera